Aviation High School, formerly Hendra Secondary College, is a high school in Widdop Street, Hendra, Queensland, Australia. The Principal is David Munn.

History
Aviation High is located in Clayfield, Brisbane, near the Brisbane International Airport and Toombul shopping centre. It has had a number of name changes over the years; ‘Hendra Secondary College’, as it was known previously, opened on Tuesday 29 January 1963 as Hendra State High School. In 1990 the name changed to Hendra Secondary College, and provided not only education to students, but also to adults who could enroll in the school and participate in grades 10-12. The Principal is David Munn who was appointed in Semester 2 2013.

Aviation High has three sporting houses that compete against each other, Miller, Hinkler, and Kingsford-Smith, named after famous Australian aviators Robin Miller, Bert Hinkler, and Charles Kingsford-Smith respectively. The competition between the houses is tight in the annual Cross-Country, Swimming, Athletics and Intra-School sport.

Extra-curricular activities offered by Aviation High are often utilised by not only students but also members of staff. Two activities are key to the aviation focus the school has, the 'UAV Program' and the 'Rocketry Group'. The UAV program is a successful entrant to the annual UAV Outback Challenge, held at Kingaroy and Calvert in alternative years. The school won the event in 2009, and several students have received the Airmanship Award, for displaying diligence and sportsmanship during the 2-day event. The Rocketry Group participates in the Australian Youth Rocketry Challenge, winning the event in 2011. The UAV Challenge is held by Engineering Teacher Steve Wright and Aerospace (Aeroskills Technology) Head of Department Jack Clarke. It is widely utilised with several teams fielded each year, and supported by companies such as Hobby King, which donated several components when the UAV program was decimated by floods in 2015. The Rocketry Group is facilitated by the Science Department, consisting of a smaller group including Physics and Aerospace teachers. However, the group is used primarily for experience in componentry by junior grades before gaining the necessary skills for the more advanced UAV program.

The school has 11 main buildings, A, B, C, D, E, H, J, K, L blocks, the Hall, and the Canteen. A Block is mainly computer rooms, with one science lab on the lower level of the building. B block is where the communications department has many rooms, with the exception of a Technology lab, and a Computer workshop, leased to the Rotary Club of Nundah. A dedicated high-end computer room, where coding classes take place, and a recording studio, are also located in this block. C block is a multi-use block, with the administration office and many general-use classrooms being located here. D block is the Aeroskills Technology Block, where Manual Arts and Graphics takes place. The block has 3 workshops and one classroom - for Graphics. A laser cutter is located in this block. E block is an annex to A block, with a Multi Media Room (Theatre) and Career Education being housed here. H block is where the Hospitality kitchens are located, as well as theory classrooms, and a cabin-crew training area, with actual seats from a Boeing 767 being used for realism. J block is the dedicated Science block, with 4 science laboratories and a special room for Flight Simulator's inside J block. Most Science classes are held here, and are all fitted with smart-boards as standard. K Block is another name for the Library. The Library houses over 1000 books, and a gym underneath for HPE classes. There are also 2 annexes for classes to be held, or presentations to be given as well as a computer room. L Block is where Art classes are held. Inside is a studio, and a Mac Lab. Outside is a Fire-powered kiln, for clay works completed over the year. Next to L block is the Hall, which is used for Futsal, Basketball, Assemblies and (once) plane storage. The hall is well used. The Canteen is a popular place at Aviation High, with fresh food is prepared by a school-hired chef. 

Aviation High is also home to No. 220 Squadron, Australian Air Force Cadets, where cadet activities, and weekly Monday night parades are held, with the squadron's headquarters housed in a demountable building.

Location
Aviation High is located on Widdop St in Clayfield, Queensland on an approximately  sized block. The school is located near to Centro Toombul Shopping Centre which is a hub of public transport. The Toombul and Eagle Junction Railway Stations are only a few minutes walk away and the school has a bus stop outside, utilised by many students. Its unique location near the Airport Link Tunnel also allows several students easy access to school, especially people not local to the school's catchment.

"Gateway to Aerospace Industries" programme
In 2004, the school became part of the "Gateway to the Aerospace Industries" programme. This programme added elements to the curriculum at schools around the state, in order to give students an environment that was relevant to their careers in the aviation industry. It does this by incorporating aviation themes and topics into each subject, as well as by promoting pathways to aviation careers.

By the end of 2006, the Aerospace Project had been so successful that the then Queensland Premier, Peter Beattie, MP announced the establishment of Aviation High on the existing Hendra Secondary College site. Classes commenced in January 2007 under the new name; although it would take over a year before uniforms and other items bearing the previous name Hendra Secondary College, were completely replaced.

Aviation Centred Learning
Aviation High tries to include aviation into its subjects where possible, this achieved through aviation centred learning, where aviation themed questions are used to deliver the syllabus, such as aviation-related mathematics (e.g. Find the distance a plane can fly with x amount of fuel) and science. From year nine onwards, it also has classes dedicated to aviation (such as avionics). There are lunchtime and after-school programs and activities such as; UAV (Unmanned Aerial Vehicle) Club, Flight Simulator Club, Hangar/Engineering Club, and more. These are all accessible to all students from years 7-12.

Partnerships
The school has partnerships with companies offering entry into courses relating to aircraft maintenance and cabin-crew training, especially Aviation Australia, as well as partnerships with TAFEs for students to access vocational training.

Aviation High staff and students are at an advantage due to the close partnerships and relationships with aerospace industry partners, as well as direct-entry offers to courses at Griffith University and QUT, amongst others.

Enrolment
The number of enrolments at the beginning of 2015 stand at 376 students. Furthermore, the Combined Pilots and Learners group (CPL) have made their name in Canberra by sending a number of students to a tour of Canberra, visiting the Australian War Memorial and the Australian Defence Force Academy. The USA trip also is popular, with students traveling to NASA Space Camp, and later, California. A new tour has recently been announced, taking students to the Western Front and other historical battlefields in Europe. The tours now happen in alternating years.

References

External links
 https://web.archive.org/web/20110715201126/http://www.rolanddg.com/R-WORLD/v04/aviation.html
 http://aviationhigh.eq.edu.au/

Public high schools in Brisbane
Technical schools in Queensland
Aviation schools in Australia
Aviation in Queensland
2007 establishments in Australia
Educational institutions established in 2007